Lastebasse is a town in the province of Vicenza, Veneto, Italy. It is on SP350.  As of 2007 Lastebasse had an estimated population of 247.

Sources
(Google Maps)

Cities and towns in Veneto